Coastal Development Authority is a government body of  State Government of Karnataka. Its headquarters is situated in Mangalore, Karnataka. The authority works to develop of the three coastal districts of Karnataka named Dakshina Kannada, Udupi and Uttara Kannada.

History
Coastal Development Authority was established in 2009. Mattar Ratnakar Hegde is the chairman of the authority. The State Government had granted  to the authority for the year of 2022–2023.

References

External links 
 

Organisations based in Karnataka
Government agencies established in 2009
State urban development authorities of India